Evolution is the third album by Brazilian heavy metal band Viper, release in 1992.

Track listing
 "Coming From The Inside" (P. Passarel) — 3:55
 "Evolution" (P. Passarel) — 5:17
 "Rebel Maniac" (P. Passarel) — 3:34
 "Dead Light" (Y. Passarel) — 4:06
 "The Shelter" (Machado) — 4:04
 "Still The Same" (Machado) — 4:32
 "Wasted" (P. Passarel, Machado) — 4:51
 "Pictures Of Hate" (P. Passarel, Machado) — 4:40
 "Dance Of Madness" (P. Passarel) — 4:30
 "The Spreading Soul" (P. Passarel) — 4:53
 "We Will Rock You" (May) (Queen cover) — 2:15

Credits
Pit Passarell — bass guitar, vocals
Yves Passarell — guitar
Felipe Machado — guitar
Renato Graccia — drums

Additional musicians:
 Sascha Paeth - backing vocal
 Thomas Rettke - backing vocal
 Helge Engelke - string arrangements

References

External links
 Viper official site

1992 albums
Viper (band) albums
Massacre Records albums
Albums produced by Charlie Bauerfeind